McNamara Island is a mainly ice-covered island,  long, which is partly within the north edge of the Abbot Ice Shelf, Antarctica, about  east of Dustin Island.

See also 
 List of Antarctic and sub-Antarctic islands

References

Islands of Ellsworth Land